David Johnson Foster (June 27, 1857 – March 21, 1912) was an American lawyer and politician. He served as a U.S. Representative from Vermont.

Biography
Foster was born in Barnet, Vermont, a son of Jacob Prentiss Foster and Matilda (Cahoon) Foster.  He attended the public schools in Barnet and graduated from St. Johnsbury Academy in 1876 and Dartmouth College in Hanover, New Hampshire in 1880.

He studied law and was admitted to the bar in 1883. He began the practice of law in Burlington, Vermont. Foster served as Chittenden County State's Attorney from 1886 until 1890. He served as a member of the Vermont State Senate from 1892 until 1894. Foster was the first president of the Young Men's Republican Club of Vermont, which was organized in 1894. He was state tax commissioner from 1894 until 1898.

He served as chairman of the board of railroad commissioners from 1898 until 1900, and as chairman of the commission representing the United States at the first Centennial of the Independence of Mexico at Mexico City in 1910. Foster was the chairman of the United States delegation to the general assembly of the International Institute of Agriculture at Rome in May 1911.

Foster was elected as a Republican candidate to the Fifty-seventh and to the five succeeding Congresses, serving from March 4, 1901 until his death in Washington, D.C. on March 21, 1912. He served as chairman of the Committee on Expenditures in the Department of Commerce and Labor during the Fifty-ninth, Sixtieth and Sixty-first Congresses. He served as the chairman on the Committee on Foreign Affairs in the Sixty-first Congress.

Foster was interred in Lakeview Cemetery in Burlington, Vermont.

Personal life

Foster married Mabel M. Allen Foster in 1883. They had three children together, Mabel Foster, Mathilde Foster and Mildred Foster.

See also

List of United States Congress members who died in office (1900–49)

References

Further reading
 "The Vermonter, Volumes 4-5" by Charles S. Forbes, 1898.

External links
 
 Biographical Directory of the United States
 
 The Political Graveyard
 Govtrack.us
 Our Campaigns
 David J. Foster, late a representative from Vermont. Memorial addresses delivered in the House of Representatives and Senate (1913).

1857 births
1912 deaths
Vermont lawyers
State's attorneys in Vermont
Republican Party Vermont state senators
Dartmouth College alumni
People from Barnet, Vermont
Politicians from Burlington, Vermont
Republican Party members of the United States House of Representatives from Vermont
19th-century American politicians
Burials at Lakeview Cemetery (Burlington, Vermont)
19th-century American lawyers
20th-century American politicians